The Valley District was an organization of the Confederate States Army and subsection of the Department of Northern Virginia during the American Civil War, responsible for operations between the Blue Ridge Mountains and Allegheny Mountains of Virginia.  It was created on October 22, 1861, and was surrendered by the authority of Gen. Robert E. Lee at Appomattox Court House on April 9, 1865.

Background

The Valley District was created to administer various home guard and military units and armies which operated in the Shenandoah Valley.  The first forces organized in this area prior to the creation of the Valley District were the Forces In and About Harper's Ferry, Virginia, which existed from April 18, 1861, to June 15, 1861.  The Forces In and About Harper's Ferry were originally under the Virginia State Militia, and were placed under three commanders during that time.  Maj. Gen. Kenton Harper (Virginia State Militia) commanded from April 18 to April 28, then command fell to Col. Thomas J. "Stonewall" Jackson's (Virginia State Militia) from April 28 to May 24, and finally the forces were transferred to the Confederate States Army and Brig. Gen. Joseph E. Johnston from May 24 to June 15, 1861.

From June 15 to October 22, military organization in the Shenandoah Valley came under local leadership until the Department of Northern Virginia. It was created on October 22, 1861, as Johnston prepared defenses in Northern Virginia.  The Valley District was defined as the area between the Blue Ridge Mountains, the Alleghenies and extended south from the Potomac River to the vicinity of Staunton, Virginia and covered an area of roughly five thousand square miles.

Three districts were created under the Department of Northern Virginia were:

The Aquia District 
First commander: Maj. Gen. Theophilus H. Holmes
Period of existence: October 22, 1861 to April 18, 1862
The Potomac District
First commander: Gen. Pierre G. T. Beauregard
Period of existence: October 22, 1861 to January 29, 1862
The Valley District
First commander: Maj. Gen. Thomas J. "Stonewall" Jackson
Period of existence: October 22, 1861 to April 9, 1865,

While the Aquia and Potomac Districts ceased to exist by the spring of 1862, the need remained for military organization in the Valley throughout the remainder of the war.

1864

During 1864, while under the command of Lt. Gen. Jubal Early, the Valley District operated its own independent army, the Army of the Valley, which was essentially composed of the Second Corps, Army of Northern Virginia.  The Second Corps was detached from Lee's main army to invade, threaten and assault Washington, D.C., on the hopes of drawing forces away from Lt. General Ulysses S. Grant's forces, and thereby relieving pressure on his siege around Richmond, and Petersburg, Virginia.

Command history

See also
Army of Northern Virginia
Winchester in the American Civil War
Stonewall Jackson's Headquarters Museum
Army of the Valley

Notes

References
 Tanner, Robert G. Stonewall in the Valley: Thomas J. "Stonewall" Jackson's Shenandoah Valley Campaign, Spring 1862. Garden City, NY: Doubleday, 1976. .
 Weigley, Russell F. A Great Civil War: A Military and Political History, 1861–1865. Bloomington and Indianapolis: Indiana University Press, 2000. .

Confederate States Army
Virginia in the American Civil War
1861 establishments in the Confederate States of America